Hurrah! I'm a Father or Hurrah! I'm a Papa is a 1939 German comedy film directed by Kurt Hoffmann and starring Heinz Rühmann, Albert Florath, and Carola Höhn.

It was shot at the Marienfelde and Tempelhof Studios in Berlin. The film's sets were designed by the art directors Heinrich Beisenherz and Alfred Bütow.

Synopsis
Peter, a dissolute student, ignores his wealthy farmer father's attempts to get him to reform. However, when he finds a small child left in a room with a note attached explaining that he is the child's father he is forced to become a changed man. He hires a young woman to act as the child's nurse not realizing that she is really the child's mother.

Cast

References

Bibliography

External links 
 

1939 films
Films of Nazi Germany
German comedy films
1939 comedy films
1930s German-language films
Films directed by Kurt Hoffmann
Films with screenplays by Thea von Harbou
German black-and-white films
UFA GmbH films
Films scored by Hans Lang
Cine-Allianz films
Films shot at Tempelhof Studios
1930s German films
Films shot at Terra Studios